M. V. Jayarajan (born 24 May 1960) is an Indian politician and a member of the Communist Party of India (Marxist) Kerala State Committee and secretary of the CPI(M) Kannur District Committee.

Life and career
He was born to V. K. Kumaran and M. V. Devaki on 24 May 1960. He is a graduate and has an LLB. He married K. Leena and has two sons.

He held the positions of all India joint secretary and state secretary of DYFI, the youth wing of CPI(M), during his youth.

He was elected to the Kerala Legislative Assembly in 1996 and 2001 from Edakkad constituency in Kannur District. He is also known for serving as the private secretary of the Chief minister of Kerala Mr. Pinarayi Vijayan for a few years, in one of the rare instances in which a high profile leader has served in that post. He quit this post in 2019 when he was elected as the district secretary of Kannur for CPI(M) to replace P. Jayarajan who was about to contest the then upcoming Lokasabha election.

References 

1960 births
Living people
Communist Party of India (Marxist) politicians from Kerala
Kerala MLAs 1996–2001
Kerala MLAs 2001–2006